Mali requires its residents to register their motor vehicles and display vehicle registration plates. Current plates are European standard 520 mm × 110 mm, and use FE-Schrift. The international vehicle registration code for Mali is RMM.

References

Mali
Transport in Mali
Mali transport-related lists